Scopula rivularia is a moth of the  family Geometridae. It is found in western China.

References

Moths described in 1897
rivularia
Moths of Asia